The Coastal Municipalities Water Utility is the organization responsible for water and sanitation services in the Palestinian Gaza Strip. Its services were severely damaged in the 2008–2009 Israel–Gaza conflict.

External links
 Official website

References

Water in the State of Palestine
2000 establishments in the Palestinian territories